Rauno is an Estonian and Finnish masculine given name, and may refer to:

 Rauno Aaltonen (born 1938), Finnish former professional rally driver
 Rauno Alliku (born 1990), Estonian professional footballer
 Rauno Bies (born 1961), Finnish former sport shooter and Olympic medalist
 Rauno Heinla (born 1982), Estonian strongman competitor 
 Rauno Korpi (born 1951), Finnish ice hockey coach 
 Rauno Lehtinen (1932-2006), Finnish conductor and composer
 Rauno Lehtiö (born 1942), Finnish ice hockey player
 Rauno Mäkinen (1931-2010), Finnish former wrestler and Olympic medalist
 Rauno Miettinen (born 1949), Finnish former Nordic combined skier
 Rauno Esa Nieminen (born 1955), Finnish musician, writer, artist, and researcher
 Rauno Nurger (born 1993), Estonian basketball player
 Rauno Pehka (born 1969), Estonian former professional basketball player
 Rauno Ronkainen (born 1964), Finnish TV and film cinematographer and cameraman
 Rauno Ruotsalainen (born 1938), Finnish footballer
 Rauno Sappinen (born 1996), Estonian professional footballer
 Rauno Saunavaara (born ????), Finnish paralympic track and field athlete 
 Rauno Sirk (born 1975), Estonian military commander
 Rauno Suominen (1939–2018), Finnish tennis player and coach
 Rauno Tamme (born 1992), Estonian volleyball player 

Estonian masculine given names
Finnish masculine given names